Blender is a Swedish dansband, founded in March 2002 by Lasse Lundberg. Soon, the band became a full-time dansband and since then has played all over Sweden.

In 2007 they won the Guldklaven award in the "Album of the Year" and they have also got several other awards.

In 2009 the single "Ingen ingenting" was qualified to Sveriges Radio P4's so called B rotation list, which guaranteed it a lot of airplay over the radio each week. On 12 December 2009 the band participated with The Playtones, Titanix, Casanovas and Bhonus in the last of the qualification sets in Dansbandskampen and performed two songs: "Dag efter dag" and "Hold Me Now". Then they also played in the final, but did not win the contest.

In 2011 the band scored a success with the album Ingen utan mig, reaching fourth position at Sverigetopplistan.

Members
Lasse Lundberg (1968) - drums, vocals
Maria Persson (1980) - vocals
Magnus Åkerlund (1974) - guitar
- 2008 Urban (1971) - keyboard, vocals
Rikard André (1971) - keyboard, vocals
Robert Norberg (1985) - bass

Discography

Albums
Live i studio - 2002
Live i studio 2 - 2004
Alla essen på handen - 2007
Live i studio 3 - 2008
Välkommen in - 2009
Ingen utan mig - 2011
På väg till Malung - 2012 (CD+DVD)
Live i studio 4 - 2012

Singles
Head over Heels - 2003
It Must Be Love - 2004
Du tänder alla ljus - 2006

Awards 
2003 - Lasse Lundberg - Guldklaven Drummer of the Year
2003 - Blender - nominated for Newcomer of the Year 
2004 - Andreas Westman - nominated for Bassist of the Year 
2005 - Blender - nominated for Dansband of the Year
2005 - Magnus Åkerlund - Guldklaven Guitarist of the Year
2006 - Ulf Härnström - Guldklaven Keyboardist of the Year
2007 - Maria Persson - nominated for Singer of the Year
2007 - Blender - Guldklaven Album of the Year (Alla essen på handen)
2009 - Robert Norberg - nominated for Bassist of the Year

References

External links
Blender

Dansbands
2002 establishments in Sweden
Musical groups established in 2002